Leiolepis peguensis, the Burmese butterfly lizard, is a species of agamid lizard. It is found in Myanmar.

References

Leiolepis
Reptiles of Myanmar
Reptiles described in 1971